El Poder del Norte (The Power of the North) is a Mexican norteño band which was formed in 1987 in Monterrey Nuevo León. It was formed by brothers Buenrostro Arturo, the accordionist, and Martin, the drummer. 

In their first few years, they were known as Los Pioneros del Norte.  They were given an electric drum, which they used for their cumbias.

Arturo's brother, Martin, also composed songs, such as "Buenos dias California" and "Ni que valieras tanto".

History
In 1990, Los Pioneros recorded their first album La Suburban de la muerte for Metro Casa Musical (now Peerless-MCM, a division of Warner Music Latina). A year later, they recorded "Cuando Llegaste Tu" and were able to hit strides with singles such as "El Radio" and "Que Se Vayan Al Diablo".

In 1993, the group, now adopting the name "El Poder Del Norte", signed with Discos Sabinas (Disa), and recorded Mi decision, this is his current record label, in that recorded their first video of the song "Como te extraño", and launched the songs "Mi decision", "Llueve sobre mojado", and includes "La polkita de Don Tony".

In 1994, launched Como llama with the hits "Como llama", "En tu sonrisa" and "Enamorada", that song has a video.

Around 1995 was about to launch a theme that was never released, a song of Freddie Martinez, Mi arbol y yo,(My tree and me),through no fault was not released to radio or some compilation album, if not only was on a promotional disc with Los Reyes Del Camino and Espuela Dorada, artists also recorded for Disa, but, in 1995, launched El Autentico y Unico, with the hits "Piel de angel", "No sera facil", "Te quiero tanto", this song has a video, and "Por primera vez".

Next of 1996, launch in March 1997, Aqui estan...!, with "Y aqui estoy", "Maldito orgullo", "Acepto mi derrota", and "Pero me perdonas", that song and "Y aqui estoy" has a video, and change that logo.

In 1998, launched 15 Poderosos Corridos, a special edition with only corridos, with "El pase de la pantera", a song with a video, "Paso en mi pueblo" and "Donde estara mi caballo".

That same year launched Con Ganas de Ti, with "Ganas de ti", "Te felicito", "De que sirvio" and "Para que me engaño", the themes "Ganas de ti" and "De que sirvio" has a video.

Next of 1999, in August 2000, launched A Ellas, in a special paperboard pack, the songs of that album, was "A ella", "Me llenaste de amor", "Ni que valieras tanto" and "Porque tuvo que ser", the themes "A ella", "Ni que valieras tanto" and "Porque tuvo que ser", has a video.

In 2001, recorded that first live concert with the name of El Autentiko y Unico En Vivo, with two previously unreleased tracks, "Pequeña amante" and "No me olvides", the first has a video, and of the concert was launched the theme "La radio".

In 2002, launched Imaginate Sin Ellos, with the songs "Vestido blanco", "Decidete", "Piel por piel" and "Enamórate de alguien".

In 2003, the group undergoes a change of members, now becoming a cluster of six elements, and launch La Decada, as part of the celebration of that tenth anniversary in Disa, and that career.

Next, in 2005, released two albums, Ranchero, with the songs "En tu basura" and "Que se te olvido", and El gigante de la musica norteña, with the singles "No te culpes", "La otra", "Que voy a hacer sin ti" (With Pablo Montero), and "Porque tenia que conocerte", and again change that logo.

In 2006, launched that second live album 13 años de Exitos En Vivo, an album with DVD.

In 2007, appears Por siempre, with the songs "Que me parta un rayo", "Hablemos" and "Ya vez".

In 2008, launched XV, production which called for the fifteen years of that artistic career, with the song "Ultimas noticias", something strange in the video for this last song, Martin, on his drum, has two bass drums

In 2011 return with the songs "Te lo pido de rodillas" and "Que Diosito te perdone".

Hits 
In the hits of that group are: "La Suburban de la muerte", "La radio", "Mi decision", "Llueve sobre mojado", "Como te extraño", "Enamorada", "Como llama", "En tu sonrisa", "Piel de angel", "No sera facil", "Te quiero tanto", "Y aqui estoy", "Maldito orgullo", "Acepto mi derrota", "Pero me perdonas", "El pase de la pantera", "Paso en mi pueblo", "Donde estara mi caballo", "Ganas de ti", "Te felicito", "De que sirvio", "Para que me engaño", "A ella", "Ni que valieras tanto", "Porque tuvo que ser", "Pequeña amante", "Vestido blanco", "Decidete", "Piel por piel", "Enamórate de alguien", "Que nunca llores", "En tu basura", "Que se te olvido", "No te culpes", "Porque tenia que conocerte", "La otra", "Que voy a hacer sin ti" (With Pablo Montero), "Que me parta un rayo", "Hablemos" and "Ultimas noticias".

Discography 
1989: "El Poder de la Banda"      (As Los Pioneros)
1990: "La Suburban de la muerte" (As Los Pioneros)
1991: "Cuando Llegaste Tú"       (As Los Pioneros)
1992: "Buena Onda" (As Los Pioneros)
1993: "Mi decision"
1994: "Como llama"
1995: "El Autentiko y Unico"
1997: "Aqui estan...!"
1998: "15 Poderosos Corridos"
1998: "Con Ganas de Ti"
2000: "A ellas"
2001: "El Autentiko y Unico En Vivo" (First Live Album)
2002: "Imagínate sin ellos"
2003: "La Decada"
2005: "Ranchero"
2005: "El Gigante de la musica norteña"
2006: "13 Años de Exitos En Vivo" (Second Live Album)
2007: "Por siempre"
2008: "XV"

External links 
 Aprende a Tocar Las Canciones de Este grupo Aquí
 
 Chalino.com

Mexican musical groups